Naasa Hablood, also known as Virgin's Breast Mountain, are twin hills situated in Maroodi Jeex, Somaliland. Located on the outskirts of the city of Hargeisa, they are made up of granite and sand. The hills were dubbed Naasa Hablood (lit. "girl's breasts") due to their distinctive conical shape and resemblance to thelarchic breast buds.

See also
Breast-shaped hills

Notes

References
Nasa Hablood, Somalia

External links

Somaliland - Tourism attractions

Geography of Somaliland
Mountain ranges of Somaliland
Geography of Somalia